Dury is a commune in the Pas-de-Calais department in the Hauts-de-France region of France.

Geography
The A26 autoroute closely passes by the village.

Population

Places of interest
 The church of St.Martin, dating from the twentieth century.
 Two Commonwealth War Graves Commission cemeteries.

See also
Communes of the Pas-de-Calais department

References

External links

 The CWGC cemetery at Dury
 The CWGC cemetery at Dury Mill

Communes of Pas-de-Calais